Simone Bolelli (born 8 October 1985) is an Italian professional tennis player. Bolelli is a Grand Slam champion, having won the 2015 Australian Open doubles event with Fabio Fognini, together becoming the first all-Italian men's pair to win a Grand Slam title in the Open Era. He has a career-high ATP ranking in doubles of World No. 8 achieved on 17 August 2015 and in singles of World No. 36 achieved on 23 February 2009.

Career

2003
In 2003, Bolelli reached his first ITF Futures tournament semifinal at Egypt F1, losing to 485th-ranked Jaroslav Pospíšil. He played entirely Futures events except for one Challenger tournament in Brindisi.

2004–2005
In 2004, Bolelli reached his second Futures final, losing to Dominique Coene. He made another final and won two Futures titles, making two wins out of three finals for Futures finals in the 2004 season. He won the Italy F15 and F8 titles, and lost in the final of a Challenger event in Brașov.

In 2005, Bolelli reached the final of a Challenger in Trani.

2006: ATP debut

Simone Bolelli played in a few tournaments higher than a Challenger, reaching the quarterfinals in doubles on his Masters 1000 debut partnering with Andreas Seppi as alternates pair at the 2006 Monte Carlo Masters and also receiving a wildcard into the singles and doubles (w/ Seppi) main draws at the 2006 Rome Masters.

He also won the Como Futures tournament and made the final of Recanati, before losing to Davide Sanguinetti. He won his first Challenger singles title over Ivo Minář, and then made the final of a Challenger in Bergamo where he lost to Alex Bogdanović.

2007: Grand Slam debut in singles
Bolelli beat former world no. 1 Marat Safin in Barcelona and competed in the Miami, Rome and Hamburg Masters.

He made his Grand Slam debut at the 2007 French Open.

2008: First singles final
In May, Bolleli reached his maiden final at the clay-court 2008 BMW Open tournament in Munich, where he was defeated by Fernando González.

In September, Simone Bolelli was banned by The Italian Tennis Federation from national team events for skipping the Davis Cup tie with Latvia in Europe-Africa zone relegation playoff. The ban prevented Bolelli from playing in Davis Cup competition and the Olympics. It also prevented him from getting wild cards. Bolelli said that he had told Italy captain Corrado Barazzutti well in advance of the tie that he preferred to work on his fast-court game in Asia.

2009: Top 40 singles ranking

2010–15: Major doubles title, three ATP 250 titles
At the 2015 Australian Open, Bolelli and Fabio Fognini captured their first Grand Slam championship doubles title. The Italian duo, playing their ninth major together, defeated French pair Pierre-Hugues Herbert and Nicolas Mahut in straight sets 6–4, 6–4 in the final. They also reached the semifinals of the 2015 French Open and three Masters finals at the 2015 Indian Wells Masters, 2015 Monte-Carlo Masters and 2015 Shanghai Rolex Masters.

2016: First ATP 500 title
In February 2016, Bolleli won his second biggest title in doubles at the ATP 500 2016 Dubai Tennis Championships with Andreas Seppi.

2021: Wimbledon semifinal and three titles
In 2021 Bolleli won two clay titles with new partner Máximo González at the Chile Open (tennis) and Emilia-Romagna Open in Parma and one grass title at the first edition of the 2021 Mallorca Championships after the walkover from the wildcard pair Novak Djokovic/Carlos Gómez-Herrera and reached two other finals. He returned to the top 50 in doubles at World No. 46 on 28 June 2021. 

Having never passed the second round and not played for five years at the 2021 Wimbledon Championships, Bolleli most successful run with his partner was to the semifinals of the Major where the unseeded pair was defeated by fourth seeded pair and eventual runners-up Marcel Granollers and Horacio Zeballos. As a result, he raised to No. 32 in the doubles rankings on 12 July 2021. He returned to the top 30 in the doubles rankings on 26 July 2021.

2022: Major quarterfinal, Second ATP 500 title

Grand Slam finals

Doubles: 1 (1 title)

Masters 1000 finals

Doubles: 3 (3 runners-up)

ATP career finals

Singles: 1 (1 runner-up)

Doubles: 23 (11 titles, 12 runner-ups)

Challenger and Futures finals

Singles: 24 (14–10)

Doubles: 13 (7–6)

Performance timelines

Singles

Notes2009 Wimbledon Championships counts as 1 win, 0 losses. Jo-Wilfried Tsonga received a walkover in the second round, after Bolelli withdrew.

Doubles

Current through the 2022 Davis Cup.

References

External links
 
 
 
 Bolelli recent match results
 Bolelli world ranking history

1985 births
Living people
Hopman Cup competitors
Italian male tennis players
Olympic tennis players of Italy
Sportspeople from Bologna
Tennis players at the 2008 Summer Olympics
Grand Slam (tennis) champions in men's doubles
Italian expatriates in Monaco
Mediterranean Games bronze medalists for Italy
Competitors at the 2005 Mediterranean Games
Mediterranean Games medalists in tennis
Australian Open (tennis) champions